The 1991 Colorado State Rams football team represented Colorado State University in the 1991 NCAA Division I-A football season. In its third season under head coach Earle Bruce, the team compiled a 3–8 record (2–6 against WAC opponents).

Schedule

Roster

References

Colorado State
Colorado State Rams football seasons
Colorado State Rams football